Jonathan Louis Oppenheim (November 10, 1952 – July 16, 2020) was an American film and television editor and producer. The son of Judy Holliday, the actress, and David Oppenheim, a clarinetist and television producer, he was mainly employed on documentary films. Oppenheim was known for his work on The Oath (2010) and Paris Is Burning (1990).

Oppenheim died on July 16, 2020, aged 67.

Partial filmography

Citations

References

External links 

 

1952 births
2020 deaths
American documentary film producers
American Jews
Television producers from New York City
American television editors
Film producers from New York (state)
American film editors